During the 1987–88 Dutch football season, PSV Eindhoven competed in the Eredivisie.

Season summary

PSV completed the European Treble by winning the Eredivisie, the KNVB Cup and the European Cup.

Squad
Squad at end of season

Transfers

In
 Søren Lerby – AS Monaco
 Anton Janssen – Fortuna Sittard

Out
 Ruud Gullit – A.C. Milan, ƒ18 million (£6 million)
 René van der Gijp – Neuchâtel Xamax
 Jurrie Koolhof – FC Groningen
 Michel Valke – Lyon

Competitions

Eredivisie

KNVB Cup

Final

European Cup

First round

Second round

Quarter-final

Semi-final

Final

Statistics

Top scorers

European Cup
 Hans Gillhaus 3

References

PSV Eindhoven seasons
Dutch football championship-winning seasons
UEFA Champions League-winning seasons
Psv Eindhoven